{{DISPLAYTITLE:Technetium (99mTc) arcitumomab}}

Technetium (99mTc) arcitumomab is a drug used for the diagnostic imaging of colorectal cancers, marketed by Immunomedics. It consists of the Fab' fragment of a monoclonal antibody (arcitumomab, trade name CEA-Scan) and a radionuclide, technetium-99m.

Chemistry
Technetium (99mTc) arcitumomab is an immunoconjugate. Arcitumomab is a Fab' fragment of IMMU-4, a murine IgG1 monoclonal antibody extracted from the ascites of mice. The enzyme pepsin cleaves the F(ab')2 fragment off the antibody. From this, the Fab' fragment is prepared by mild reduction.

Before application, arcitumomab is reconstituted with a solution of the radioactive agent sodium pertechnetate (99mTc) from a technetium generator.

Mechanism of action
Arcitumomab recognizes carcinoembryonic antigen (CEA), an antigen over-expressed in 95% of colorectal cancers. Consequently, the antibody accumulates in such tumours together with the radioisotope, which emits photons. Via single photon emission computed tomography (SPECT), high-resolution images showing localisation, remission or progression, and metastases of the tumour can be obtained.

Contraindications
Technetium (99mTc) arcitumomab is contraindicated for patients with known allergies or hypersensitivity to mouse proteins, as well as during pregnancy. Women should pause breast feeding for 24 hours after application of the drug.

Adverse effects and overdose
Only mild and transient side effects have been observed, mostly immunological reactions like eosinophilia, itching and fever. Some patients develop human anti-mouse antibodies, so there is the theoretical possibility of anaphylactic reactions. High doses of IMMU-4 (up to 20-fold diagnostic arcitumomab dose) have not led to any serious events. One patient has been reported to develop a grand mal after application.

Radioactivity can lead to radiation poisoning. Since the dose of an arcitumomab application is about 10 mSv, such an overdose is unlikely.

References

Further reading 

 
 
 
 

Radiopharmaceuticals
Technetium-99m
Technetium compounds
Antibody-drug conjugates
Monoclonal antibodies for tumors